Pomacentrus pavo, sapphire damsel, peacock damsel or blue damsel, is a damselfish from the Indo-Pacific. It occasionally makes its way into the aquarium trade.

References

External links
 Peacock Damsel @ Fishes of Australia

pavo
Marine fish of Northern Australia
Marine fish of Eastern Australia
Fish described in 1787